Joseph Gregory Wagner Luthman (born January 14, 1997) is an American actor. He is best known for his recurring role as Rad Ferris on the series Weeds.

Personal life
Luthman was born at Southview Hospital in Dayton, Ohio, on January 14, 1997. He began acting at age 5. His first performance was in Nuncrackers at the Dayton Playhouse, in Dayton, Ohio. His siblings, Jonathan Shine, Julien Shine and Lauren Shine were also in this production.

Luthman moved to Los Angeles in 2007 with his parents and younger sister Elise Luthman. He has had many TV and movie roles and now has over 60 credits on IMDb. His recently filmed guest star roles on Hawaii Five-0 and Chicago Med. Luthman is a North American professional League of Legends player. In 2017 he was given the series regular role of SPC Jonathan Riddell in the 21st Century FOX and National Geographic scripted series: The Long Road Home. The series premiered in early November 2017.

Joey Luthman was also involved in Allisyn Ashley Arm's YouTube series Astrid Clover where he portrayed her friend Beckett.

Filmography

Film

Television

Awards and nominations

References

External links

1997 births
American male child actors
American male film actors
American male television actors
Living people
Male actors from Dayton, Ohio
21st-century American male actors